Liz Goldwyn (born December 25, 1976) is an American filmmaker, artist, and writer.

Personal life
Goldwyn was born in Los Angeles, California, the daughter of writer Peggy Elliott Goldwyn and film producer Samuel Goldwyn, Jr. Goldwyn's paternal grandparents were movie mogul Samuel Goldwyn and film actress Frances Howard. She is the half-sister of actor Tony Goldwyn and producer John Goldwyn. Goldwyn attended School of Visual Arts in New York City where she received a B.F.A degree in Photography.

Career
Liz Goldwyn is a writer, filmmaker and artist living and working in Los Angeles. She is the writer and director of the documentary Pretty Things (HBO, 2005.) She is author of the non-fiction book Pretty Things: the Last Generation of American Burlesque Queens, (HarperCollins 2006) and the novel Sporting Guide (Regan Arts/Phaidon 2015) based on original historical research. Goldwyn’s short films include Underwater Ballet (2008), L.A. at Night (2009), The Painted Lady (2012) and Dear Diary (2013).

Museums and Universities at which Goldwyn has lectured on her work include:  UCLA; The Huntington Library; The Hammer Museum; Museum of Fine Arts, Boston; Phoenix Museum of Art; Fashion Institute of Technology (FIT); Otis School of Arts & Design; FIDM, Los Angeles County Museum of the Arts (LACMA), Yale University.

Goldwyn was New York Editor of French Vogue, 2001-2002 and had a monthly column in the Japanese magazine Hanatsubaki, “Liz Goldwyn: EYE” from 2000-2011. In September 2014 she became the first guest editor of Town & Country in its 168-year history. She has contributed to publications including The New York Times Magazine, The Financial Times, British Vogue and Vanity Fair.

Goldwyn has been commissioned as an artist and designer by M.A.C Cosmetics, Van Cleef & Arpels, Altamont Apparel and Le Bon Marché and has created jewelry for feature films including Running With Scissors (2006). Goldwyn was a global consultant for Shiseido Cosmetics from 2000-2002 where she founded and directed a fashion sponsorship and arts installation program for the company. She worked with Museum Director Thelma Golden (Studio Museum of Harlem) on a Patrick Kelly retrospective at The Brooklyn Museum of Art in 2004 and curated a documentary program at Los Angeles County Museum for the Arts (LACMA) in 2008.

A collector and authority on vintage clothing since she was a teenager, Goldwyn was hired as consultant and curator for Sotheby’s newly created fashion department in 1997 while still in college. In 2014 Goldwyn founded Vintage Vanguard with partner Karen Elson, an innovative fundraising project supporting women’s issues.

Filmography
Pretty Things (2005) (Writer, Director)
Underwater Ballet (2009) (Writer, Director)
LA at Night (2009) (Writer, Director)
The Painted Lady (2012) (Writer, Director)
Dear Diary (2013) (Writer, Director)

Bibliography
Sporting Guide: Los Angeles, 1897 (2015, Regan Arts)
Pretty Things: The Last Generation of American Burlesque Queens (2006, Harper Collins)
Sonia Rykiel (2009, Rizzoli) (Contributing Essay)

References

External links

1976 births
American women film directors
Film producers from California
Jewish American actresses
American film actresses
Living people
School of Visual Arts alumni
Writers from Los Angeles
American women writers
Film directors from Los Angeles
American women film producers
21st-century American Jews
21st-century American women
Goldwyn family